Boris Godunov (1551–1605) was a Russian tsar.
  
Boris Godunov may also refer to:

 Boris Godunov (opera) (1874) by Modest Mussorgsky
 Boris Godunov (play) (1831) by Alexander Pushkin
 Boris Godunov (1954 film) of Mussorgsky's opera
 Boris Godunov (1986 film), adaptation of Pushkin's play
 Boris Godunov (1989 film) of Mussorgsky's opera
 Boris Godunov (2011 film) based on the Pushkin play

See also
 Boris Goudenow, 1710 opera by Johann Mattheson